Swiss-born Kosovan rapper Loredana has released two studio albums, a collaborative album, 25 singles as a lead artist and six as a featured artist.

Albums

Studio albums

Collaborative albums

Singles

As lead artist

2010s

2020s

As featured artist

Notes

References

External links 

Discographies of Swiss artists
Discographies of Albanian artists